Master Geng (died  975 CE) was a Chinese alchemist.

Geng was employed at the Imperial Court. She distilled perfumes, and utilized an early form of the Soxhlet process to extract camphor into alcohol, and gained recognition for her skill in using mercury to extract silver from ores.

Notes and references 

10th-century Chinese women
10th-century Chinese scientists
Medieval women scientists
Chinese alchemists
10th-century alchemists
Perfumers
970s deaths
Year of death uncertain
Year of birth unknown
Chinese courtiers